Pamudurthi Bayapa Reddy was an Indian politician. He was a Member of Parliament, representing Hindupur, Andhra Pradesh in the Lok Sabha the lower house of India's Parliament as a member of the  Indian National Congress.

References

External links
 Official biographical sketch in Parliament of India website

Lok Sabha members from Andhra Pradesh
Indian National Congress politicians
1920 births
India MPs 1971–1977
India MPs 1977–1979
India MPs 1980–1984
Possibly living people